Robert John Wuthnow (born 1946) is an American sociologist who is widely known for his work in the sociology of religion. He is the Gerhard R. Andlinger Professor of Sociology Emeritus at Princeton University, where he is also the former chair of the Department of Sociology and director of the Princeton University Center for the Study of Religion.

Life and career

Wuthnow was born in Kansas on June 23, 1946. He earned his Bachelor of Arts degree at the University of Kansas in 1968 and his Doctor of Philosophy degree in sociology at the University of California at Berkeley in 1975. His dissertation was Consciousness and the Transformation of Society. While at Berkeley, Wuthnow worked closely with Charles Glock, Neil Smelser, Robert Bellah, Guy Swanson, and Gertrude Selznick. Wuthnow's first years at Berkeley were during the widespread protests on campus around the US, which ultimately inspired his dissertation. Glock and Bellah received a grant to study the symbolic—especially the religious—dimensions of the counter-culture movement from the Institute for Religion and Social Change. This four-year project resulted in the edited volume The New Religious Consciousness in 1976. Wuthnow realized that the counter-culture movements were just the most prominent evidence of deeper changes in American culture and used data from the project to argue this in his dissertation, eventually published as The Consciousness Reformation in 1976.

After a couple years as an instructor at the University of Arizona from 1974 to 1976, when he took position as assistant professor of sociology at Princeton University where he is currently.

Wuthnow has published widely in the sociology of religion, culture, and civil society. His current research and teaching focuses on social change, the sociology of belonging, community, rural sociology, religion and politics, and theory.

Wuthnow is editor of The Encyclopedia of Politics and Religion and received the first Tufts University Civic Engagement Prize in 2007.

In 2009, Wuthnow received the Warren J. Mitofsky Award for Excellence in Public Opinion Research from the board of directors of the Roper Center for Public Opinion Research at Cornell University. He was elected to the American Philosophical Society in 2013.

Books 

Acts of Compassion: Caring for Others and Helping Ourselves (1990) Spanish translation (1996)
After Heaven: Spirituality in America Since the 1950s (1998) 
All in Sync: How Music and Art are Revitalizing American Religion (2003)
America and the Challenges of Religious Diversity (2005)
American Mythos (2006)
Be Very Afraid (2010)
Boundless Faith (2009)
Christianity and Civil Society: The Contemporary Debate (1996)
Christianity in the 21st Century: Reflections on the Challenges Ahead (1993)
Communities of Discourse: Ideology and Social Structure in The Reformation, The Enlightenment and European Socialism (1989)
The Consciousness Reformation (1976)
Creative Spirituality: The Way of the Artist (2001)
The Crisis in the Churches: Spiritual Malaise, Fiscal Woe (1997)
Cultural Analysis: The Work of Peter L. Berger, Mary Douglas, Michel Foucault, and Jürgen Habermas (with others, 1984) Spanish translation (1988) Chinese translation (1994)
Experimentation in American Religion: The New Mysticisms and their Implications for the Churches (1978)
God and Mammon in America (1994)
The God Problem: Expressing Faith and Being Reasonable (2012)
Growing Up Religious: Christians and Jews and Their Journeys of Faith (1999)
Learning to Care: Elementary Kindness in an Age of Indifference (1995)

Loose Connections: Joining Together in America's Fragmented Communities (1998)
Meaning and Moral Order: Explorations in Cultural Analysis (1987)
Poor Richard's Principle: Recovering the American Dream through the Moral Dimension of Work, Business, and Money (1996)
Producing the Sacred: An Essay on Public Religion (1994)
Rediscovering the Sacred (1992) Macedonian translation (2003)
Red State Religion: Faith and Politics in America's Heartland (2012) 
Remaking the Heartland (2011)
The Restructuring of American Religion: Society and Faith and Since World War II (1988)
Rough Country: How Texas Became America's Most Powerful Bible Belt State (2014)
Saving America? Faith-Based Services and the Future of Civil Society (2004)
Sharing the Journey: Support Groups and America's New Quest for Community (1994)
Small-Town America: Finding Community, Shaping the Future (2013)
The Struggle for America's Soul (1989)

See also
 Charles Y. Glock

References
 CV

External links
 Interview with Robert Wuthnow
 "The Moral Minority", article by Wuthnow
 2003 Lake Lecture:Faith and Giving: From Christian Charity to Spiritual Practice

American sociologists
Sociologists of religion
Living people
1946 births
Members of the American Philosophical Society